or Sadqah ("charity", "benevolence", plural  )   in the modern context has come to signify "voluntary charity". According to the Quran, the word means voluntary offering, whose amount is at the will of the "benefactor".

Etymology and meaning
'Sadaqah' literally means 'righteousness' and refers to the voluntary giving of alms or charity. In Islamic terminology, sadaqah has been defined as an act of "giving something...without seeking a substitute in return and with the intention of pleasing Allah." Meanwhile, according to Ar-Rageeb al-Asfahaani “Sadaqa is what the person gives from what he possesses, like Zakat, hoping to get closer to Allah."

The term 'sadaqah' stems from the Arabic root word ‘sidq’ (s-d-q) , which means sincerity and it is considered as a sign of sincere faith. The three-letter root of this word, S-D-Q, also means, "to speak the truth," "to be sincere," and "to fulfill one's promise." All of these aspects of honorable behavior indicate the links between generosity and a healthy society. Some modern researchers also try to etymologically link the word sadaqa to the Hebrew  sedāḳā (almsgiving). Some experts hence conclude that sadaqa is a loanword.

Examples of sadaqah include:
 To administer justice between two people
 To remove harm from a road/removing thorns, bones and stones from paths
 A good word
 Every step taken towards prayer
 Guiding the blind
 Supporting the weak with the strength of your arms
Smiling at others

In Islamic texts

Quran

The word zakah occurs 30 times in the Quran, out of which, 27 times it is linked with prayer. There are three places where it has not been linked ... (Quran 41:7). The zakah mentioned in these thirty places is in reference to the obligatory zakah. However, Sadaqah (non-obligatory charity) and its plural (sadaqat) occur thirteen times in the Qur'an; five times as Sadaqah, eight times as its plural.
Sadaqat is very wide term and used in the Quran to cover all kinds of charity. Sadaqat means to give alms and also legal alms for which the word zakat is used in the Quran and the Sunnah of the Prophet Muhammad. Zakat has been called sadaqat because it is also a kind of compulsory charity. It is an obligatory sadaqa while ordinary sadaqa are voluntary. Thus, zakat has to be collected by the muhtasib (collector) or the government—the Islamic state as a Compulsory levy.
 According to Quran, Sadaqa leads into the purification of the benefactor. Quran says that sadaqa should not be necessarily be in a material form and can be a "voluntary effort", or a kind word. This is in agreement with a narration attributed to Muhammad which says "every good deed is a form of sadaq." Kind words and "compassion" are better than sadaqa accompanied by "insult", from the viewpoint of Quran, and it is better for the donations to be offered "discreetly" to those in need rather than doing it in public in order to be acknowledged by them. The Quran also criticizes donating aimed at appearing generous or compromising the value of sadaqa by "ostentatious public behavior" done just to "render a normally charitable act purely self-serving." Quran suggests that sadaqa is not meant only to support the poor, but also can be donated to others who "were not visibly in need" and also who either needed assistance to enhance their life or required to be directed towards new jobs and "economic opportunities".

There are many verses on Sadaqat (Charity), either voluntary or obligatory. Among whom are stated below: 
And be steadfast in prayer; practise regular charity; and bow down your heads with those who bow down (in worship).
They ask thee what they should spend (In charity). Say: Whatever ye spend that is good, is for parents and kindred and orphans and those in want and for wayfarers. And whatever ye do that is good, -Allah knoweth it well.
Kind words and the covering of faults are better than charity followed by injury. Allah is free of all wants, and He is Most-Forbearing.
Allah will deprive usury of all blessing, but will give increase for deeds of charity: For He loveth not creatures ungrateful and wicked.
Those who believe, and do deeds of righteousness, and establish regular prayers and regular charity, will have their reward with their Lord: on them shall be no fear, nor shall they grieve.
So fear Allah as much as ye can; listen and obey and spend in charity for the benefit of your own soul and those saved from the covetousness of their own souls, they are the ones that achieve prosperity.

Hadith
According to some hadiths, "a kind word and smile" can be considered as sadaqa and the best form of it is "passing on knowledge." Also, Muhammad said in a hadith that sadaqa removes seventy gates of evil.

Difference from zakat

The word is interchangeably used with Zakat and Nafaqa in some contexts, but while zakat is obligatory, Sadaqa usually refers to voluntary donations.
Zakat is a required minimum contribution by Muslims in terms of money and property or goods that can help the muslims who mostly need assistance, while Sadaqah can be in forms of money, deeds, property or salutations. 
The term 'sadaqah' was used in Qur'an and Sunnah for both zakat and charity. Among the differences between  them is that in the case of Zakat, the amount is fixed, utilized according to that which has been stated by the Islamic Law and is paid only once a year. Meanwhile, charity has no fixed percentage and one is free to pay it as many times as one can afford or feel inclined to it.

Etiquette
 Sadaqah should be from one's legitimate possessions and property.
 According to Qur'an 2:274, it is better to offer sadaqah in secret. 
 Sadaqah should not be accompanied by reproaching the person who is given the sadaqa.
 Sadaqah should be out of pure intentions for God. 
 Sadaqah should be from possessions you love.

Categories of the entitled
According to Quran 9 verse 60, there are eight categories of people who are entitled to receive Sadaqah (Zakaat). They are: 
The poor (al-fuqarâ’), that is low-income.
The needy people (al-masākīn).
The officials appointed to receive Sadaqah (Zakat Administrators).
Those whose hearts have been (recently) reconciled to Islam (al-mu'allafa qulubuhum).
To free the slaves and captives. 
Those who are overburdened with debt. 
In the cause of Allah to spread the message of Islam. 
To those who are wayfarers (travelers who do not have enough money to go back home).

Significance

Social contribution
 It enhances the well-being of the people in Islamic society.
 It helps in fulfilling the requirement of the poor Muslims. 
 It lightens the debt of the Muslim debtors. 
 It helps in taking care of those whose hearts have been (recently)reconciled (to the Truth). 
 It helps the stranded Muslims to complete their journey. 
It helps in the healing of various Sickness(according to the prophet of Islam).

Spiritual effects
 It purifies human's heart from the sins of malice, greed, and the obsessive love of wealth. 
 It increases the wealth. 
 It removes bad luck.
 It helps in crossing the bridge of Siraat.
 It guarantees heaven.

See also

Alms
Khums
Tzedakah (Judaism)
Zakat
Al-Kaffarah
 Zidqa, almsgiving in Mandaeism

Notes

Thus . See Arabic phonology.

References

Further reading
 Debasa, Ana Maria Carballeira, Charity and Poverty, in Muhammad in History, Thought, and Culture: An Encyclopedia oxf the Prophet of God (2 vols.), Edited by C. Fitzpatrick and A. Walker, Santa Barbara, ABC-CLIO, 2014, Vol. I, pp. 92–96. 1610691776
 Oxford Islamic Studies On-line

External Links
 Urdu Book about Islamic concept of Sadaqah مالی قربانی کا اسلامی تصور

Islamic worship
Islamic terminology
Arabic words and phrases
Alms in Islam